Überschall (German Überschall: supersonic) is an improvisational rock band based in Las Vegas, Nevada consisting of past and present Blue Men and band members of Blue Man Group. Uberschall frequently performs at the Double-Down Saloon.

Members 
Jordan Cohen - Drums
Christian Brady - Guitar
Charles Henry - Guitar
Elvis Lederer - Guitar
Wickett Tony Pickett - Bass
Jeff Tortora - Drums
Todd Waetzig - Drums

References 

Rock music groups from Nevada
Musical groups from Las Vegas